Shil may refer to:

 Shil, Borande, a village in Palghar district of Maharashtra, India
 Shil, Moho Budruk, a village in Palghar district of Maharashtra, India